The Kuwaiti Emir Cup is the premier cup competition involving teams from the Kuwaiti Premier League and the Kuwaiti Division One league.

The 2011 edition is the 48th to be held.

The winners qualify for the 2012 AFC Cup.

First round

Quarter-finals

Semi-finals

Final

2011
2010–11 in Kuwaiti football
2010–11 domestic association football cups